Sivaji Raja (born 26 February 1962) is an Indian actor who primarily appears in Telugu films and television series. He appeared in more than 400 films. He is also known for his work in TV serials Amrutam, Alasyam Amrutham Visham, Mr.Romeo, Pandu Mirapakai, Papam Padmanabham and Moguds Pellams. He has won four Nandi award and a Santosham Film Award.

Filmography

Films

Television

References

External links
 

Telugu comedians
Indian male film actors
Telugu male actors
Living people
Indian male comedians
Male actors in Telugu cinema
20th-century Indian male actors
21st-century Indian male actors
People from West Godavari district
Male actors from Andhra Pradesh
1962 births
Santosham Film Awards winners
Male actors in Telugu television
Indian male television actors
Nandi Award winners